The Flavelle Medal is an award of the Royal Society of Canada "for an outstanding contribution to biological science during the preceding ten years or for significant additions to a previous outstanding contribution to biological science". It is named in honour of Joseph Wesley Flavelle and is awarded bi-annually. The award consists of a gold plated silver medal.

Recipients
Source: Royal Society of Canada
 2022 - Graham Bell, FRSC
 2020 - Marla Sokolowski, FRSC
 2018 - Francis Plummer, FRSC
 2016 - 
 2014 - Spencer Barrett, FRSC
 2012 - Siegfried Hekimi, FRSC
 2010 - Kenneth B. Storey, FRSC
 2008 - John Smol, FRSC
 2006 - Brett B. Finlay, FRSC
 2004 - Brian D. Sykes, FRSC
 2002 - Lewis E. Kay
 2000 - David R. Jones, FRSC
 1998 - Anthony Pawson, FRSC
 1996 - Ian C.P. Smith, FRSC
 1994 - Robert J. Cedergren, MSRC
 1992 - Michael Smith, FRSC
 1990 - Peter W. Hochachka, FRSC
 1988 - Robert Haynes, FRSC
 1986 - G.H. Neil Towers, FRSC
 1984 - Robert G.E. Murray, FRSC
 1982 - Clayton Oscar Person, FRSC
 1980 - Gordon H. Dixon, FRSC
 1978 - Louis Siminovitch, FRSC
 1976 - Michael Shaw, FRSC
 1974 - Juda Hirsh Quastel, FRSC
 1972 - Douglas Harold Copp, FRSC
 1970 - William Edwin Ricker, FRSC
 1968 - Jacques Genest, MSRC
 1966 - Erich Baer, FRSC
 1965 - William Stewart Hoar, FRSC
 1964 - Gleb Krotkov, FRSC
 1963 - Robert James Rossiter, FRSC
 1962 - Frederick Ernest Joseph Fry, FRSC
 1961 - Charles Philippe Leblond, FRSC
 1960 - Edmund Murton Walker, FRSC
 1959 - Murray L. Barr, FRSC
 1958 - Allan Grant Lochhead, FRSC
 1957 - Thomas Wright M. Cameron, FRSC
 1956 - George Lyman Duff, FRSC
 1955 - Charles Samuel Hanes, FRSC
 1954 - David Alymer Scott, FRSC
 1953 - Everitt George Dunne Murray, FRSC
 1952 - Archibald G. Huntsman, FRSC
 1951 - Wilder G. Penfield, FRSC
 1950 - Charles Herbert Best, FRSC
 1949 - W.P. Thompson, FRSC
 1948 - Margaret Newton, FRSC
 1947 - Guilford Bevil Reed, FRSC
 1946 - William Rowan, FRSC
 1945 - Robert Boyd Thomson, FRSC
 1944 - Velyien Ewart Henderson, FRSC
 1943 - B.P. Babkin, FRSC
 1942 - John Hubert Craigie, FRSC
 1941 - , FRSC
 1940 - Robert William Boyle, FRSC
 1939 - James Playfair McMurrich, FRSC
 1938 - W. Lash Miller, FRSC
 1937 - Frank D. Adams, FRSC
 1936 - J.B. Collip, FRSC
 1935 - Frank T. Shutt, FRSC
 1934 - Louis Vessot King, FRSC
 1933 - Joseph Burr Tyrrell, FRSC
 1932 - John Stanley Plaskett, FRSC
 1931 - Sir Frederick Banting, FRSC
 1930 - Archibald Byron Macallum, FRSC
 1929 - Arthur Henry Reginald Buller, FRSC
 1928 - Arthur Philemon Coleman, FRSC
 1927 - Sir Arthur G. Doughty, FRSC
 1926 - Sir John C. McLennan, FRSC
 1925 - Sir Charles E. Saunders, FRSC

See also
 List of biologists
 List of biology awards
 List of awards named after people

References

Canadian science and technology awards
Royal Society of Canada
Awards established in 1925
Biology awards